The following radio stations broadcast on FM frequency 105.1 MHz:

Argentina
 Centauro in La Tigra, Chaco
 Centro in Basavilbaso, Entre Ríos
 Caroya in Colonia Caroya, Córdoba
 Córdoba in Córdoba
 Escobar in Belén de Escobar, Buenos Aires
 La 100 Rosario in Rosario, Santa Fe
 La 105 Libertad in Neuquén
 La Única in Puerto Madryn, Chubut
 105.1 in 25 de Mayo, Buenos Aires
 de la Montaña in San Martín de los Andes, Neuquén
 Impacto in Pozo del Molle, Córdoba
 La 105 in Carlos Casares, Buenos Aires
 Municipal in Ulapes, La Rioja
 Parroquial in Buenos Aires
 Radio María in General Pico, La Pampa
 Radio Sur in Berisso, Buenos Aires
 Ser Otro Ser in San Martín, Buenos Aires
 Tiempo in Cutral Có, Neuquén
 San Cayetano in Tigre, Buenos Aires

Australia
 Triple M Melbourne
 Life FM in Bendigo
 5TRX in Port Pirie
 ABC Classic in Renmark
 2PB in Wagga Wagga
 Radio National in Cairns
 Rhema FM in Bundaberg

Belarus 
 Autoradio in Minsk.

Canada (Channel 286)
 CBDE-FM in Brochet, Manitoba
 CBDG-FM in Shamattawa, Manitoba
 CBDH-FM in Uranium City, Saskatchewan
 CBDL-FM in Destruction Bay, Yukon
 CBGA-9-FM in Cloridorme, Quebec
 CBI-FM in Sydney, Nova Scotia
 CBIG-FM in Arviat, Nunavut
 CBIH-FM in Cape Dorset, Nunavut
 CBII-FM in Igloolik, Nunavut
 CBIJ-FM in Pangnirtung, Nunavut
 CBIK-FM in Pond Inlet, Nunavut
 CBIL-FM in Resolute, Nunavut
 CBIN-FM in Cambridge Bay, Nunavut
 CBIO-FM in Kugluktuk, Nunavut
 CBIQ-FM in Taloyoak, Nunavut
 CBKC-FM in Ile-a-la-Crosse, Saskatchewan
 CBKN-FM in Island Falls, Saskatchewan
 CBMP-FM in Chisasibi, Quebec
 CBMQ-FM in Waskaganish, Quebec
 CBMR-FM in Fermont, Quebec
 CBMW-FM in Nouveau-Comptoir, Quebec
 CBND-FM in Postville, Newfoundland and Labrador
 CBNP-FM in Port Hope Simpson, Newfoundland and Labrador
 CBOK-FM in Kapuskasing, Ontario
 CBQB-FM in Rae/Edzo, Northwest Territories
 CBQD-FM in Fort Resolution, Northwest Territories
 CBQE-FM in Fort Good Hope, Northwest Territories
 CBQK-FM in Faro, Yukon
 CBQO-FM in Deline, Northwest Territories
 CBQP-FM in Pickle Lake, Ontario
 CBQR-FM in Rankin Inlet, Nunavut
 CBRY-FM in Alert Bay, British Columbia
 CBUF-FM-5 in Kitimat, British Columbia
 CBU-FM-2 in Metchosin/Sooke, British Columbia
 CBVW-FM in Waswanipi, Quebec
 CBWD-FM in Waasagomach, Manitoba
 CFAI-FM-1 in Grand-Sault, New Brunswick
 CFIC-FM in Restigouche/Listuguj, Quebec
 CFMD-FM in Muskrat Dam, Ontario
 CFRL-FM in Rigolet, Newfoundland and Labrador
 CHOQ-FM in Toronto, Ontario
 CITA-FM in Moncton, New Brunswick
 CJED-FM in Niagara Falls, Ontario
 CJVR-FM in Melfort, Saskatchewan
 CKDG-FM in Montreal, Quebec
 CKHI-FM in Holman Island, Northwest Territories
 CKHY-FM in Halifax, Nova Scotia
 CKQM-FM in Peterborough, Ontario
 CKRY-FM in Calgary, Alberta
 VF2210 in Kemano, British Columbia
 VF2278 in Snowdrift/Lutselk, Northwest Territories
 VF2305 in McBride, British Columbia

China 
 CNR Business Radio in Anshan
 CNR Music Radio in Shijiazhuang
 CNR The Voice of China in Xianyang

Costa Rica
 Omega Estereo in San Jose, Costa Rica

Indonesia
 RRI Batam Pro-1 in Batam and Singapore
 Prambors in Makassar, Indonesia
 I-Radio in Bandung, Indonesia

Malaysia
 Asyik FM in Cameron Highlands, Pahang 
 Molek FM in Kota Bharu, Kelantan

Mexico
XHATM-FM in Morelia, Michoacán
XHCJZ-FM in Ciudad Jiménez, Chihuahua
 XHCPAK-FM in Campeche, Campeche
 XHCPAZ-FM in Tampico, Tamaulipas
XHERJ-FM in Mazatlán, Sinaloa
XHEZUM-FM in Chilpancingo, Guerrero
XHIM-FM in Ciudad Juárez, Chihuahua
XHJF-FM in Tierra Blanca, Veracruz
XHLEO-FM in León, Guanajuato
XHMBM-FM in Guadalajara, Jalisco
XHMMO-FM in Hermosillo, Sonora
XHNAY-FM in Bucerias, Nayarit
XHNI-FM in Nogales, Sonora
XHNUC-FM in Cancún, Quintana Roo
XHOLA-FM in Puebla, Puebla
XHRCG-FM in Ciudad Acuña, Coahuila
XHTNC-FM in Tancítaro, Michoacán
XHYD-FM in Francisco I. Madero, Coahuila
XHYJ-FM in Nueva Rosita, Coahuila
XHZ-FM in Mérida, Yucatán

Philippines
DWBM-FM in Mega Manila
DZBM in Baguio
DYUR in Cebu City
DXYS in Davao City

United States (Channel 286)
 KAKT in Phoenix, Oregon
 KAMT in Channing, Texas
 KAOC in Cavalier, North Dakota
  in Tracy, Minnesota
 KAVM in Cold Bay, Alaska
  in Lindsay, Oklahoma
 KCFL-LP in Aberdeen, Washington
  in Garden City, Missouri
 KCRV-FM in Caruthersville, Missouri
  in Ames, Iowa
  in Abilene, Texas
 KEVK-FM in Sanderson, Texas
 KFCB-LP in Douglas, Wyoming
  in Kachina Village, Arizona
  in Abbeville, Louisiana
  in Dededo, Guam
 KHOV-FM in Wickenburg, Arizona
  in Lompoc, California
  in Honolulu, Hawaii
  in Boise, Idaho
 KJXN in South Park, Wyoming
  in Auberry, California
  in Duluth, Minnesota
 KKGO in Los Angeles, California
 KKRG-FM in Santa Fe, New Mexico
 KLXB in Bermuda Dunes, California
  in Seadrift, Texas
 KMEC-LP in Ukiah, California
  in Cameron, Texas
  in Conway, Arkansas
  in Sacramento, California
  in Pacific Grove, California
 KOSB in Perry, Oklahoma
  in Willard, Missouri
 KPFN-LP in Laytonville, California
 KPGN-LP in Pierre, South Dakota
 KQRT in Las Vegas, Nevada
 KQWB-FM in Breckenridge, Minnesota
 KRFH-LP in Arcata, California
  in Molalla, Oregon
  in Juneau, Alaska
 KTMC-FM in Mcalester, Oklahoma
 KTTY in New Boston, Texas
 KTUG in Hudson, Wyoming
 KUAV-LP in Winterhaven, California
 KUDD in American Fork, Utah
  in Lewiston, Idaho
  in Maljamar, New Mexico
  in Whitefish, Montana
 KXGB-LP in Great Bend, Kansas
 KXIQ-LP in Brownsville, Texas
  in Denver, Colorado
 KXMX in Muldrow, Oklahoma
  in Lufkin, Texas
  in Billings, Montana
 KZKR in Jonesville, Louisiana
 KZPL in Encinal, Texas
 KZQD in Liberal, Kansas
 KZYS-LP in St. Cloud, Minnesota
 WALJ in Northport, Alabama
  in Great Barrington, Massachusetts
  in Panama City Beach, Florida
  in Arlington, Virginia
 WBNH-LP in Bedford, New Hampshire
 WCIS-FM in Deruyter, New York
  in Jamestown, Tennessee
 WCYC-LP in London, Ohio
 WDCG in Durham, North Carolina
  in Shelbyville, Illinois
 WFOZ-LP in Winston-Salem, North Carolina
 WGEM-FM in Quincy, Illinois
 WGFG in Branchville, South Carolina
  in Cheboygan, Michigan
 WGHL in Shepherdsville, Kentucky
  in Lakeville, Minnesota
 WHAR in Havelock, North Carolina
  in Ellettsville, Indiana
  in Coral Gables, Florida
 WHTR-LP in Rosemark, Tennessee
  in Williamsport, Pennsylvania
  in Ponce, Puerto Rico
  in Ephrata, Pennsylvania
 WJDX-FM in Kosciusko, Mississippi
 WJKB in Sheffield, Pennsylvania
  in Saint Albans, West Virginia
  in Plattsburgh, New York
  in Blackshear, Georgia
 WLFN in Waverly, Tennessee
 WLVG in Clermont, Georgia
  in Detroit, Michigan
 WMHX in Waunakee, Wisconsin
 WMNM-LP in Mount Morris, Wisconsin
 WMUG-LP in Indiana, Pennsylvania
  in Evanston, Illinois
  in Orlando, Florida
 WOXF in Oxford, Mississippi
  in Johnsonville, South Carolina
 WPFL in Century, Florida
  in Decatur, Indiana
 WQNS in Woodfin, North Carolina
 WQSB in Albertville, Alabama
 WQXK in Salem, Ohio
 WRFS in Rockford, Alabama
  in Lancaster, Kentucky
 WSBW in Ephraim, Wisconsin
 WTAO-FM in Murphysboro, Illinois
  in Skowhegan, Maine
 WTUK in Harlan, Kentucky
  in Cincinnati, Ohio
 WUIE in Lakesite, Tennessee
  in Providence, Rhode Island
  in New York, New York
 WWRE in Bridgewater, Virginia
 WWZT-LP in Tampa, Florida
 WXNV-LP in Loganville, Georgia

References

Lists of radio stations by frequency